The list of World War I flying aces from Estonia contains one name:

 Jaan Mahlapuu reputedly scored six aerial victories while flying for the Imperial Russian Air Service.

References

Estonia
Estonian military personnel
Estonian military-related lists
Lists of Estonian people by occupation
Estonian military personnel of World War I
Estonian aviators